Gilbert Bridge, also known as Hall Estate Bridge, is a historic Pratt truss bridge in Monaghan Township, York County, Pennsylvania and Upper Allen Township, Cumberland County, Pennsylvania. The steel bridge was built by the Wrought Iron Bridge Company and crosses the Yellow Breeches Creek.

It was added to the National Register of Historic Places in 1988.

References

Road bridges on the National Register of Historic Places in Pennsylvania
Bridges completed in 1899
Bridges in Cumberland County, Pennsylvania
Bridges in York County, Pennsylvania
1899 establishments in Pennsylvania
National Register of Historic Places in York County, Pennsylvania
Steel bridges in the United States
Pratt truss bridges in the United States